The following lists events that happened during 1989 in Singapore.

Incumbents
President: Wee Kim Wee
Prime Minister: Lee Kuan Yew

Events

January
 1 January – Perfect Ten 98.7FM officially launched as very first 24-hour radio station in Singapore.
 13 January – The Public Works Department announced the building of two bridges to Sentosa and Pulau Brani, which will be completed by 1992.
 15 January – TransitLink starts operations, which is formed by SMRT, Singapore Bus Services and Trans-Island Bus Services to develop an integrated bus-rail public transport system.

February
 21 February – Tradewinds starts its first flight, which is formed in 1975 as a hotelier.

April
 14 April – The National Skin Centre is officially opened to treat skin diseases and research skin conditions.
 30 April – Change Alley closes its doors. It reopens as an air-conditioned passageway in 1993.

June
 10 June – The New Psychiatric Hospital (now known as the Institute of Mental Health) starts construction, which has state of the art facilities when completed.

August
 26 August – The first community hospital starts construction in Ang Mo Kio. The hospital will have community involvement with the participation of family doctors.

September
 1 September – The Urban Redevelopment Authority is revamped, taking over land use planning from the Ministry of National Development. This results in the transfer of properties to Pidemco Land (present day CapitaLand).

November
 1 November – The National Youth Council is formed as a division of the People's Association to work on youth matters.
 4 November – The sixth section of the MRT system is opened from Marina Bay to Tanah Merah.
 6 November – Singapore is one of the founding members of the Asia-Pacific Economic Cooperation (APEC).

December
 6–10 December – 1989 World Badminton Grand Prix is held.
 16 December – The seventh section of the MRT system is opened from Simei to Pasir Ris.
28 December – SingTel launches its ISDN network, making Singapore the first in the world to have ISDN nationwide.
 31 December – Singapore Indoor Stadium is officially opened, supporting sports and entertainment events over the years.

Births
 19 February – Xu Bin, actor.
 1 March – Joshua Ang, actor.
 23 May – Tosh Zhang, actor.
 18 June – Gen Neo, K-Pop singer.
 18 August – Yu Mengyu, national table tennis player.
 26 October – Shayna Ng, national bowler.
 13 December – Ian Fang, actor.

Deaths
 12 January – Lee Lim – Artistic photographer (b. 1931).
 23 March – Lee Dai Sor – Cantonese storyteller (b. 1913).
 11 October – Haji Ya'acob bin Mohamed – Former politician, diplomat (b. 1925).

References

 
Singapore
Years in Singapore